The 1988–89 Detroit Red Wings season saw the Red Wings finish in first place in the Norris Division with a record of 34 wins, 34 losses, and 12 ties for 80 points. They lost the Division Semi-finals four games to two to the Chicago Blackhawks.

Offseason

NHL Draft

Regular season
October 6, 1988: In a game against the Detroit Red Wings, Wayne Gretzky made his debut as a member of the Los Angeles Kings. Gretzky scored on his first shot, and contributed 3 assists in an 8-2 victory.

Final standings

Schedule and results

Player statistics

Skaters

Goaltending

†Denotes player spent time with another team before joining the Red Wings. Stats reflect time with the Red Wings only.
‡Traded mid-season
Bold/italics denotes franchise record

Playoffs
The Red Wings won their second straight division championship and went against Chicago in the first round in a best of seven series and lost in 6 games, or 2-4.

Awards and records
 Steve Yzerman, Club Record, Most Points in One Season (155)
 Steve Yzerman, Lester B. Pearson Award
 Gerard Gallant, Left Wing, NHL Second All-Star Team

References
Red Wings on Hockey Database

Detroit
Detroit
Detroit Red Wings seasons
Norris Division champion seasons
Detroit Red
Detroit Red